Winsome Hall Andrew (1905–1997) was an Australian architect.

Background and career 
Andrew was born in Woollahra, New South Wales in 1905. She was the fifth child born of ten to Arthur Hall and Susy Foy. Being raised in a middle-class family, Andrew and her siblings had a tough upbringing due to their mother coming from a wealthy family and their father working for the New South Wales public service as a surveyor on a clerical wage. Arthur Hall had a strict eye for perfection and only expected the highest of standards from his sons and daughters. Winsome attended Sydney Girls High School where she was an outstanding student both academically and athletically. This ensured her a scholarship to study architecture at the University of Sydney from 1922 to graduate in 1928, where she was the sole woman in her year and the only woman graduate to proceed to find employment.

Andrew's life at university were some of her best as she attended theatres and balls, settled down to a long-term boyfriend (potential fiancé) and started to cement herself within the confines of a looming architectural profession.

Partial list of works
The following buildings designed either in part or in full by Andrew:

Awards

 1934 RIBA competitions Medal, Stockleigh Hall at Regent Park
 1936 RIBA competitions Medal, Police Section House residential block
 1939 Sulman Award (winner), Manly Surf Pavilion
 1948 Anzac House Competition (second place), Anzac House

References

External links
 Winsome Hall Andrew 1905-1997 (Australian Women's History Forum)
 Winsome Hall Andrew (Women's History Month)
 Winsome Hall Andrew (AN INTERPRETATIVE BIOGRAPHY OF WINSOME HALL ANDREW )
 “Practising Women Architects” Sydney Morning Herald 14 May 1954, p.13
 “Girl Architect Runs a Business” Sunday Times (Perth) 12 January 1941, p.19

1905 births
1997 deaths
Australian women architects
New South Wales architects
20th-century Australian architects
People educated at Sydney Girls High School
University of Sydney alumni
20th-century Australian women